The Formartine and Buchan Way is a long-distance trail in Scotland, extending from Dyce north to Peterhead and Fraserburgh in the Buchan and Formartine districts of Aberdeenshire in Scotland. It follows the track of a former railway line, the Formartine and Buchan Railway, and is open to walkers, cyclists and horse riders. The railway closed in 1979 (Fraserburgh) and 1970 (Maud-Peterhead). The walkway opened in the early 1990s, and is managed by Aberdeenshire Council. It is listed as one of Scotland's Great Trails by NatureScot. Places of interest along the way include Drinnes Wood Observatory, Strichen Stone Circle, Aden Country Park, Deer Abbey and The White Horse at Strichen.

An information pack detailing the route has been produced by Aberdeenshire Council: the pack can be purchased from local tourist information centres and is also available to download. The route is also marked on OS maps. The path is well signposted and is easy to follow. The track is relatively flat and undulates only when roads have to be crossed. It is well maintained, and few parts are overgrown. However, the Maud to Strichen section has a detour because of overgrown shrubbery, marshy conditions and numerous problems such as gates and fences blocking access.

Much of the route is not suitable for those on adapted cycles, due to frequent access barriers, except where the route is shared by National Cycle Network Route 1, between Auchnagatt and Maud.

Sections

History of the route

Passenger services were withdrawn by the Scottish Region of British Railways in 1965 as part of the Beeching cuts. Freight trains continued to operate to Peterhead until 1970 and Fraserburgh until 1979. This was in spite of the fact a considerable amount of freight traffic was being generated by the off-shore oil and gas industry. Conversion of the line to a footpath and cycleway started in 1987, and was led by the Buchan Countryside Group.

See also
Deeside Way

References

External links 

Official Website from Aberdeenshire Council
Formartine and Buchan Way guide and mapping on Walkhighlands
Information about the former railway

Rail trails in Scotland
Footpaths in Aberdeenshire
Scotland's Great Trails